John Lee Gray Jr. (born June 19, 1960) is a retired American world class 800 meter runner from the mid-1980s to the late 1990s and the holder of the 600m world best. A four-time-Olympian (1984-1996) in 1985 he set the US record of 1:42.60 at a meet in Koblenz.  That time puts Gray as the nineteenth fastest performer of all time.  He came seventh in the 1984 Summer Olympics, fifth in 1988, and won the bronze medal at the Barcelona Olympics of 1992. In 1993 Gray was one of the favourites to win a gold medal at the World Championships in Stuttgart as he had won the A-race at the prestigious meeting in Zurich. However, he failed to qualify for the final in Stuttgart. He also set the world 600 meter record in 1986 at 1:12.81. In 1992 and 1993 Gray came close to breaking the world indoor record over 800 m several times. He held the US indoor record at 1:45.00 (Sindelfingen 1992) till February 2019.

Running career
Gray went to Crenshaw High School, Santa Monica College, Arizona State University and received his graduate degree from California State University, Los Angeles. He ran his "professional" career for the Santa Monica Track Club. When he qualified for the 1996 Olympics by winning the 1996 Olympic Trials on his 36th birthday, he became the oldest male American track athlete to qualify for the Olympics.  Other older athletes who qualified were throwers, race walkers, marathoners and pole vaulter Jeff Hartwig. Joetta Clark holds the same honor for women.

Having led the Olympic 800 m race at the 1992 Summer Olympics with a blazing first lap at better than world record pace, Gray was passed twice during the final lap to claim the bronze medal. A reporter later asked him what he would have done differently if he could run the race a second time, and it is rumored that he responded, "I would have taken it out harder." This tactic also resulted in some devastating failures as in the 1987 and 1993 World Championships when he jogged to the finish of quarterfinal races, depleted and defeated.  He walked to the finish of the 1980 Olympic Trials.

He was inducted into the USA National Track and Field Hall of Fame Dec. 2008. Also member of Santa Monica College Hall of Fame, Millrose Games in NYC Hall of Fame, Mt. Sac Relays Hall of Fame, and obtained the key to the city for Santa Monica, Inglewood, Walnut, Agoura Hills and New York.

Masters career
Gray attempted to extend his career into masters athletics.  He had stated he intended to set new world records at all distances from 200 metres to the mile. At age 40, he ran the 800 in 1:48.81 at the 2001 USA Indoor Track and Field Championships, which is the World Masters Athletics record indoors.  The time was superior to the outdoor world record, most recently held by Jim Sorensen, until that record was surpassed by Anthony Whiteman, May 20, 2012.  Based on IAAF rule 260.18a, that should have been the world record, but it was never formally recognized.

Coaching
After competing in six Olympic Trials (1980-2000) he turned to coaching.  His foremost protege' was SMTC teammate Khadevis Robinson, who Gray coached to 5 National Championships.  Robinson might best be remembered as the odd man out in the famous "Oregon sweep" at the 2008 Olympic Trials.  That might be the second closest Olympic Trials race, to Gray's own 1984 trials, when Gray finished second, but was given the same (American record) time as Earl Jones, and James Robinson was the odd man out with the same time as 3rd place John Marshall.

Gray also coached at Harvard-Westlake School for six years.  He then worked as an assistant coach at the University of California, Los Angeles with Jeanette Bolden.  In 2013, when Boldon moved to head the University of Central Florida program, Gray followed suit. Gray is now coaching top American Duane Solomon.

Competition record

References

External links
 
 Johnny Gray at USA Track and Field
 
 

1960 births
Living people
American male middle-distance runners
Olympic bronze medalists for the United States in track and field
Athletes (track and field) at the 1984 Summer Olympics
Athletes (track and field) at the 1988 Summer Olympics
Athletes (track and field) at the 1992 Summer Olympics
Athletes (track and field) at the 1996 Summer Olympics
Sportspeople from Los Angeles
Athletes (track and field) at the 1987 Pan American Games
Athletes (track and field) at the 1999 Pan American Games
World record holders in masters athletics
UCLA Bruins track and field coaches
Track and field athletes from Los Angeles
Santa Monica College alumni
Medalists at the 1992 Summer Olympics
Pan American Games gold medalists for the United States
Pan American Games medalists in athletics (track and field)
Sports coaches from California
Sports coaches from Florida
Goodwill Games medalists in athletics
Competitors at the 1986 Goodwill Games
Competitors at the 1990 Goodwill Games
Competitors at the 1994 Goodwill Games
Competitors at the 1998 Goodwill Games
Crenshaw High School alumni
Medalists at the 1987 Pan American Games
Medalists at the 1999 Pan American Games